Richard Newport may refer to:

Richard Newport (died 1570), MP for Shropshire
Richard Newport, 1st Baron Newport (1587–1651), English peer, MP for Shropshire in 1614, 1624–1629 and for Shrewsbury
Richard Newport, 2nd Earl of Bradford (1644–1723), English peer and MP for Shropshire 1670–1685 and 1689–1698
Richard Newport (MP) (1685–1716), English MP for (Much) Wenlock and son of the 2nd Earl of Bradford
Richard Newport (bishop) (died 1318), English bishop of London
Richard Spicer alias Newport (died c. 1435), MP for Portsmouth, 1402